Triple Bend (March 20, 1968 – January 31, 1995) was an American Thoroughbred racehorse who set a world record time of 119.80 for seven furlongs on dirt in winning the 1972 Los Angeles Handicap.

Background
Bred by Leslie Combs II, Triple Bend was sold at the 1969 Keeneland summer yearling sales for $100,000 to Vancouver industrialist Frank McMahon, the owner of Majestic Prince who won that year's Kentucky Derby and Preakness Stakes. Unfortunately, soon after McMahon purchased Triple Bend, while on a farm he became caught in a fence and his struggles left him partially paralyzed and his euthanasia became a possibility. Nursed back to health, Triple Bend raced once as a juvenile in 1970.

Racing career
Under trainer Vance Longden, in 1971 his best results races was a win in the Contra Costa Stakes plus four second-place finishes in other stakes races. A rapidly improving horse at age four, in 1972 Triple Bend ran second to Unconscious in the Strub Stakes then beat him in winning California's richest and most prestigious race, the Santa Anita Handicap. Triple Bend dead heated with Autobiography for first in the San Fernando Stakes and in winning the Los Angeles Handicap at Hollywood Park Racetrack, set a world record time of 119.80 for seven furlongs. In the late fall, Triple Bend won the Vosburgh Stakes at Aqueduct Race Track in the New York City borough of Queens.

Stud record
Retired to stud duty, Triple Bend's progeny met with only modest racing success. He died on January 31, 1995, at the age of twenty-seven.  He was standing at stud at Jackson Farm, owned by Gary L. and Christine Jackson, in Yakima, Washington.

Honors
In 1979, Hollywood Park Racetrack renamed the Lakes And Flowers Handicap in honor of Triple Bend. Since 2004, the Triple Bend Handicap has been a Grade 1 event.

References

1968 racehorse births
1995 racehorse deaths
Racehorses bred in Kentucky
Racehorses trained in the United States
Horse racing track record setters
American Grade 1 Stakes winners
Thoroughbred family 3-o